The Ukraine women's national handball team is the national team of Ukraine. It is governed by the Ukrainian Handball Federation and takes part in international handball competitions.

Results

Olympic Games

World Championship

European Championship

Other tournaments
 1992 Carpathian Trophy – Second place
 1995 Carpathian Trophy – Third place
 2000 Carpathian Trophy – Second place
 2002 Carpathian Trophy – Winner
 2006 GF World Cup – Fourth place
 2008 Carpathian Trophy – Second place
 2010 Carpathian Trophy – Third place
 2012 Carpathian Trophy – Third place

Squads
The squad for the 2014 European Women's Handball Championship.

Head coach: Leonid Ratner

References

External links

IHF profile

National team
Women's national handball teams
Handball